Krzywda may refer to the following places:
Krzywda, Lublin Voivodeship (east Poland)
Krzywda, Białobrzegi County in Masovian Voivodeship (east-central Poland)
Krzywda, Garwolin County in Masovian Voivodeship (east-central Poland)
Krzywda, Zwoleń County in Masovian Voivodeship (east-central Poland)
Krzywda, Greater Poland Voivodeship (west-central Poland)
Krzywda, Pomeranian Voivodeship (north Poland)

See also